James Franklin Barnes (June 2, 1852, Bellona, New York – October 28, 1914, Watkins Glen, New York) was an American physician and politician from New York.

Life
He was born on June 2, 1852. He studied medicine at Bellevue Hospital from 1872 to 1875. Afterwards he practiced medicine in Watkins, Schuyler County, New York.

Barnes was Supervisor of the Town of Dix in 1883; and a member of the New York State Assembly (Schuyler Co.) in 1884.

In 1894, he was appointed as Secretary to the State Board of Health.

In November 1895, he ran in the 40th District for the New York State Senate, but was defeated by Republican Edwin C. Stewart. In November 1898, he ran again for the State Senate, but was defeated by Republican Charles T. Willis.

Barnes was again a member of the State Assembly in 1900; and was Minority Leader.

Sources

1852 births
1914 deaths
Democratic Party members of the New York State Assembly
People from Watkins Glen, New York
People from Yates County, New York
Town supervisors in New York (state)